Jamie Murray and John Peers were the defending champions, but lost in the quarterfinals to Alexander Zverev and Mischa Zverev.

Alexander Peya and Bruno Soares won the title, defeating the Zverev brothers in the final, 4–6, 6–1, [10–5].

Seeds

Draw

Draw

References
 Main Draw

2015 BMW Open